Ricardo van den Bos (born 17 November 1984) is a Dutch kickboxer and boxer, fighting out of Zwolle. He is a four time WBC International Muay Thai Heavyweight Champion and the Dutch Amateur Boxing Heavyweight Champion of 2010.

Career
Van den Bos was initially set to fight Marvin Eastman for the vacant WPMF World Super Heavyweight (+95.454 kg/210.4 lb) Championship at Muaythai Superfight in Pattaya, Thailand on May 13, 2013. The event was pushed back to June 14, 2013, however, and he KO'd Eastman to take the belt.

He was on the receiving end of a brutal first round KO from Raul Cătinaș the SuperKombat World Grand Prix 2013 Final Elimination in Ploiești, Romania on November 9, 2013.

Titles
 2013 WPMF World Super Heavyweight Champion
 2010 Dutch Amateur Boxing Heavyweight Champion 
 2006 WBC Muaythai International Heavyweight Champion (3 title defenses) 
 2001 Dutch Amateur Boxing Super Middleweight Champion

Kickboxing record 

|-
|-  bgcolor="#FFBBBB"
| 2018-03-25 || Loss||align=left| Fred Sikking || WFL: Wildcard Tournament, Semi Finals || Almere, Netherlands || Decision  || 3  || 3:00
|-  bgcolor="#FFBBBB"
| 2013-11-09 || Loss ||align=left| Raul Cătinaș || SuperKombat World Grand Prix 2013 Final Elimination || Ploiești, Romania || KO (left hook) ||1 || 1:40
|-
|-  bgcolor="#FFBBBB"
|-  bgcolor="#CCFFCC"
| 2013-06-14 || Win ||align=left| Marvin Eastman || Muaythai Superfight || Pattaya, Thailand || TKO (punches) || 2 || 
|-
! style=background:white colspan=9 |
|-
|-  bgcolor="#FFBBBB"
| 2012-11-24 || Loss ||align=left| Michael Duut || 2 the MAXX || Hoogeveen, Netherlands || KO || 3 || 
|-  bgcolor="#FFBBBB"
| 2012-01-28 || Loss ||align=left| Ben Edwards || It's Showtime 2012 in Leeuwarden || Leeuwarden, Netherlands || Decision (3-0) || 3 || 3:00
|-  bgcolor="#FFBBBB"
| 2011-10-01 || Loss ||align=left| Pavel Zhuravlev || SuperKombat World Grand Prix III 2011, Semi Finals || Brăila, Romania || Decision (3-0) || 3 || 3:00
|-  bgcolor="#CCFFCC"
| 2011-03-06 || Win ||align=left| Raymond Bonte || Fightingstars presents: It's Showtime Sporthallen Zuid || Amsterdam, Netherlands || KO (Right high kick) || 1 ||
|-  bgcolor="#FFBBBB"
| 2010-12-17 || Loss ||align=left| Goran Radonjic || Podgorica Fight Night|| Podgorica, Montenegro || KO || 1 || 2:18 
|-  bgcolor="#FFBBBB"
| 2010-10-24 || Loss ||align=left| Raemon Welboren || Gala Top Team Beverwijk || Beverwijk, Netherlands || KO ||  || 
|-  bgcolor="#FFBBBB"
| 2010-09-12 || Loss ||align=left| Rico Verhoeven || Fightingstars presents: It's Showtime 2010 || Amsterdam, Netherlands || Decision (3-0) || 3 || 3:00 
|-  bgcolor="#FFBBBB"
| 2010-04-10 || Loss ||align=left| Sergej Maslobojev || K-1 WORLD GP 2010 in Vilnius || Vilnius, Lithuania || Decision (3-0) || 3 || 3:00 
|-  bgcolor="#FFBBBB"
| 2010-03-23 || Loss ||align=left| Brian Douwes || K-1 World MAX 2010 West Europe Tournament || Utrecht, Netherlands || Decision (3-0) || 3 || 3:00 
|-  bgcolor="#FFBBBB"
| 2010-01-02 || Loss ||align=left| Faisal Zakaria || Battle at the Beach Show || Pattaya, Thailand || Decision (2-1) || 5 || 3:00
|-
! style=background:white colspan=9 |
|-
|-  bgcolor="#CCFFCC"
| 2009-10-02 || Win ||align=left| Koos Wessels || Swolla Soldiers || Zwolle, Netherlands || Decision (3-0) || 3 || 3:00
|-  bgcolor="#CCFFCC"
| 2009-01-02 || Win ||align=left| Abbas Astraki || Battle at the Beach Show || Pattaya, Thailand || KO || 3 ||
|-
! style=background:white colspan=9 |
|-
|-  bgcolor="#CCFFCC"
| 2009-04-11 || Win ||align=left| Mutlu Karabulut || Amsterdam Fight Club || Amsterdam, Netherlands || TKO || 1 ||
|-  bgcolor="#FFBBBB"
| 2008-07-05 || Loss ||align=left| Hesdy Gerges  || Amsterdam Fightclub || Amsterdam, Netherlands || Decision (3-0) || 3 || 3:00
|-
! style=background:white colspan=9 |
|-
|-  bgcolor="#CCFFCC"
| 2008-01-04 || Win ||align=left| Tomasz Wozade || Battle at the Beach Show || Pattaya, Thailand  || Decision (3-0) || 5 ||
|-
! style=background:white colspan=9 |
|-
|-  bgcolor="#FFBBBB"
| 2007-09-08 || Loss ||align=left| Shane del Rosario || World Championship Muayhthai || Las Vegas, USA || KO (Knee strike) || 2 || 3:00
|-
! style=background:white colspan=9 |
|-
|-  bgcolor="#FFBBBB"
| 2007-05-25 || Loss ||align=left| Magomed Magomedov || K-1 Ringmasters Fight Night || Istanbul, Turkey || TKO || 3 || 
|-  bgcolor="#CCFFCC"
| 2007-03-08 || Win ||align=left| || San Jai Thai Su Jai Tai || Bangkok, Thailand || KO (Right high kick) || 1 || 
|-  bgcolor="#CCFFCC"
| 2007-02-02 || Win ||align=left| Nourdin Zidani || It's Showtime Trophy || Zwolle, Netherlands  || KO ||  ||
|-  bgcolor="#CCFFCC"
| 2007-01-03 || Win ||align=left| Malex Gadzhiev || Battle at the Beach Show || Pattaya, Thailand  || Decision (2-1) || 5 || 3:00
|-  bgcolor="#FFBBBB"
|-
! style=background:white colspan=9 |
|-  bgcolor="#CCFFCC"
| 2006-09-23 || Win ||align=left| Koos Wessels || North against South || Leek, Netherlands || KO || 1 ||
|-  bgcolor="#FFBBBB"
| 2006-04-08 || Loss ||align=left| Dzevad Poturak || K-1 Italy Grand Prix 2006 in Milan || Milan, Italy || Decision (3-0) || 3 || 3:00
|-  bgcolor="#FFBBBB"
| 2006-02-12 || Loss ||align=left| Ashwin Balrak || Dancing With the Fighters || Amsterdam, Netherlands || Decision (3-0) || 3 || 3:00
|-  bgcolor="#FFBBBB"
| 2005-12-10 || Loss ||align=left| Peter Graham || K-1 Kings of Oceania 2005 Round 3 || Auckland, New Zealand || KO (Punches) || 1 || 1:19
|-  bgcolor="#FFBBBB"
| 2005-10-08 || Loss ||align=left| Rony Sefo || K-1 Kings of Oceania 2005 Round 2 || Auckland, New Zealand || Decision (3-0) || 3 || 3:00
|-  bgcolor="#FFBBBB"
| 2005-07-10 || Loss ||align=left| Jay Hepi || K-1 Kings of Oceania 2005 Round 1 || Auckland, New Zealand || Ext.R Decision || 4 || 3:00
|-  bgcolor="#FFBBBB"
| 2005-06-25 || Loss ||align=left| Paula Mataele || K-1 Challenge 2005 Xplosion X || Auckland, New Zealand || TKO || 2 || 
|-  bgcolor="#FFBBBB"
| 2005-05-22 || Loss ||align=left| Paul Slowinski || Knees Of Fury 10, Finals || Australia || TKO (Corner stoppage) || 1 || 0:05
|-
! style=background:white colspan=9 |
|-
|-  bgcolor="#CCFFCC"
| 2005-05-22 || Win ||align=left| Hiriwa Te Rangi || Knees Of Fury 10, Semi Finals || Australia || Decision (3-0) || 3 || 3:00
|-  bgcolor="#CCFFCC"
| 2005-05-22 || Win ||align=left| Peter Sampson || Knees Of Fury 10, Quarter Finals || Australia || TKO || 1 || 
|-  bgcolor="#FFBBBB"
| 2004-05-22 || Loss ||align=left| Jason Suttie || K-1 Challenge 2004 Oceania vs World || Gold Coast, Australia || Decision (3-0) || 3 || 3:00
|-
| colspan=9 | Legend:

References

External links
Official website

1984 births
Living people
Dutch male kickboxers
Heavyweight kickboxers
Dutch Muay Thai practitioners
Sportspeople from Zwolle
SUPERKOMBAT kickboxers